Ceva Inc. is a publicly listed semiconductor intellectual property (IP) company, headquartered in Rockville, Maryland and specializes in digital signal processor (DSP) technology. The company's main development facility is located in Herzliya, Israel and Sophia Antipolis, France.

History 
Ceva Inc. was created in November 2002, through the combination of the DSP IP licensing division of DSP Group (based in Israel) and Parthus Technologies plc.
Parthus was originally named Silicon Systems Ltd, and founded in Dublin, Ireland, in 1993 by Brian Long and Peter McManamon, Parthus had its initial public offering in 2000, just as the dot-com bubble was bursting in May, 2000.
The agreement was announced in April, 2002.
The DSP Group had founded a US company originally called DSP Cores, Inc, and then Corage, Inc. in 2001.
The company used the name ParthusCeva for the combination, and planned to list its shared on Nasdaq with symbol PCVA and London Stock Exchange symbol PCV.
In December, 2003, the company dropped the "Parthus" from their name, and changed the sticker symbol to CEVA.
In 2007, it sold its stake in Dublin-based company GloNav to NXP Semiconductor for a gain of $10.9 million.

The company develops semiconductor intellectual property core technologies for multimedia and wireless communications. Ceva claimed the largest number of baseband processors in 2010, and a 90% DSP IP market share in 2011.
In July 2014 it acquired RivieraWaves SAS, a private company based in France.

A 2018 document promoting Israeli innovations mentioned the company.

In July 2019 it acquired the Hillcrest Labs sensor fusion business from InterDigital. 
Also in July 2019, it entered into a strategic partnership with a Canadian company, Immervision to secure exclusive licensing rights for its patented image processing and sensor fusion technologies for wide-angle cameras.

On May 31, 2021, Ceva acquired Intrinsix, another semiconductor design company, for an estimated $33 million.

Technologies

Imaging and computer vision 
Ceva develops technology for low-cost, low-power computational photography and computer vision. The company provides vision DSP cores, deep neural network toolkits, real-time software libraries, hardware accelerators, and algorithm developer ecosystems.

Deep learning  

Ceva develops software for deep neural networks centered on the CEVA-XM computer vision and NeuPro AI cores.

NeuPro is Ceva's family of low-power artificial intelligence processors for deep learning. NeuPro processors are self-contained, specialized AI processors, scaling in performance for a broad range of end markets including IoT, smartphones, surveillance, automotive, robotics, medical and industrial. This group of products offers high-performance configurations ranging from 2 Tera Ops Per Second (TOPS) for the entry-level processor and 12.5 TOPS for the most advanced configuration.

Wireless IoT 
Wireless connectivity is often used in devices being created for the Internet of things (IoT).
Ceva develops Wi-Fi, Bluetooth, ultra-wideband and narrowband IoT integrated wireless IoT platforms for integration into a system on a chip (SoC).

See also
 Texas Instruments TMS320
 Qualcomm Hexagon

References

Companies based in Silicon Valley
Companies listed on the Nasdaq
Computer companies of the United States
Embedded microprocessors
Semiconductor companies of Israel
Electronics companies established in 2002